Ernest Lewis William Mate (18 December 1870 – 14 December 1947) was an English footballer who played one game for St Mary's in 1888.

Club career
Born in Sandwich, Kent, Ernest Mate was a bank clerk by trade who initially played football for amateur side United Banks. He made a single appearance for St Mary's on 24 November 1888 in the 5–0 Hampshire Junior Cup first round win over Havant at the County Ground, before returning to non-league football.

References

1870 births
1947 deaths
Footballers from Kent
English footballers
Association football forwards
Southampton F.C. players